Gwendolyn Watts (23 September 1937 – 5 February 2000) was an English actress of the 1960s and 1970s. she was best known for her role as Iris in On The Buses.

Career
Born in Carhampton, Somerset, the daughter of Colin B. Watts and Annie née Lewis, Watts made her first television appearance in 1958 in an episode of Alfred Hitchcock Presents, going on to appear in Walk a Crooked Mile (1961), The Rag Trade (1962), The Avengers (1963), Maigret (1963), a French au pair in Steptoe and Son (1964), Esther Waters (1964), Mary Barton (1964), Armchair Mystery Theatre (1964), The Benny Hill Show (1965), The Worker (1965), Softly, Softly (1966), Adam Adamant Lives! (1966), Z-Cars (1962–1967), On the Buses (1969), Coronation Street (1971), Love Thy Neighbour (1972), Sam (1973) and The Final Cut (1995).

Her film appearances include Sons and Lovers (1960), So Evil, So Young (1961), Rita in Billy Liar (1963), My Fair Lady (1964), The System (1964), Fanatic (1965), The Wrong Box (1966), Carry On Doctor (1967), All Neat in Black Stockings (1968), Carry On Again Doctor (1969), The Games (1970) and Carry On Matron (1972).

Personal life
Married to actor Gertan Klauber from 1959 until her death, Watts gave up full-time acting in the early 1970s to bring up her children, but she returned a few years later. She was the sister of actress Sally Watts.

Gwendolyn Watts died in 2000, aged 62, from a heart attack.

Filmography

TV credits

References

External links
 
 
 
 Watts on The Actors' Compendium

1937 births
2000 deaths
English television actresses
English film actresses
English stage actresses
People from West Somerset (district)
20th-century English actresses